Mallaby is a surname. Notable people with the surname include:

Aubertin Walter Sothern Mallaby (1899–1945), British Indian Army officer
Christopher Mallaby (born 1936), British diplomat
George Mallaby (disambiguation), multiple people
Sebastian Mallaby (born 1964), English journalist and writer

See also
Harry Mallaby-Deeley (1863–1937), British politician